Raymond Barry Martin (born 23 January 1945) is an English former professional footballer born in Wolverhampton, Staffordshire, who played as a full back. He spent most of his professional career in England with Birmingham City, where he played 333 games in the Football League, became the club captain, and won the Player of the Year award two years running, in 1969–70 and 1970–71. His only goal for the club came against Hull City, in a 4–2 defeat at St Andrew's. He was a master of the slide tackle. The club awarded him a testimonial match against Wolverhampton Wanderers in 1971.

He later moved to the United States, initially playing for Portland Timbers and Minnesota Kicks in the North American Soccer League, and then coaching at Oregon State University.

Honours
 Football League Second Division runners-up: 1971–72

References

1945 births
Living people
Footballers from Wolverhampton
English footballers
Association football fullbacks
Aston Villa F.C. players
Birmingham City F.C. players
Portland Timbers (1975–1982) players
Minnesota Kicks players
English Football League players
North American Soccer League (1968–1984) players
English expatriate footballers
Expatriate soccer players in the United States
English expatriate sportspeople in the United States